The  is a streetcar line of Hiroshima Electric Railway (Hiroden) in Hiroshima, Japan. The line has operated since 1912.

The total distance of the line is 1.2 kilometers. Route 9 operates on the line. The line has five stations, numbered W1 through W5.

Stations

See also

References

External links 
 http://www.hiroden.co.jp/en/s-schedules.html

Hakushima Line
Railway lines opened in 1912
1912 establishments in Japan